Toronaeus is a genus of beetles in the family Cerambycidae, containing the following species:

 Toronaeus figuratus Bates, 1864
 Toronaeus incisus (Bates, 1864)
 Toronaeus lautus Monné, 1990
 Toronaeus magnificus (Tippmann, 1953)
 Toronaeus perforator Bates, 1864
 Toronaeus simillimus Monné, 1974
 Toronaeus suavis Bates, 1864
 Toronaeus sumptuosus Lane, 1973
 Toronaeus terebrans Bates, 1864
 Toronaeus virens Bates, 1864

References

Acanthocinini